
Gmina Rozdrażew is a rural gmina (administrative district) in Krotoszyn County, Greater Poland Voivodeship, in west-central Poland.

Villages
Gmina Rozdrażew contains the villages and settlements of Budy, Chwałki, Dąbrowa, Dębowiec, Dzielice, Grębów, Henryków, Maciejew, Nowa Wieś, Rozdrażew, Trzemeszno, Wolenice, Wygoda and Wyki.

Neighbouring gminas
Gmina Rozdrażew is bordered by the gminas of Dobrzyca, Koźmin Wielkopolski and Krotoszyn.

References
Polish official population figures 2006

Rozdrazew
Krotoszyn County